Jolen Daimary is an Indian politician and member of the Assam Legislative Assembly from Tamulpur. Daimary is member of the United People's Party Liberal. He won 2021 elections by elections for Tamulpur after Leho Ram Boro died of COVID-19 in 2021.

References 
5. UPPL declares candidates for Gossaigaon and Tamulpur Guwahati Times.

Members of the Assam Legislative Assembly
United People's Party Liberal politicians
Living people
People from Baksa district
Assam MLAs 2021–2026
Year of birth missing (living people)